The Association for Middle Level Education (AMLE), formerly National Middle School Association (NMSA), is an international education association dedicated exclusively to the middle level grades. With more than 30,000 members in the United States, Canada, and 46 other countries, AMLE represents principals, teachers, central office personnel, professors, college students, parents, community leaders, and educational consultants. In addition, AMLE's network includes 58 affiliates in the United States, Canada, Europe, and Australia that serve regional, state, provincial, and local needs.
 
AMLE provides professional development, journals, books, research, and other information to assist educators helping them to reach every student, grow professionally, and create great schools. As of August 2022, the organization’s chief executive officer is Stephanie Simpson.

References

Publications 
 Middle School Journal
 AMLE Magazine
 Research in Middle Level Education Online (RMLE Online)
 Research Summaries

External links 
 AMLE Website
 AMLE Online Store
 AMLE Annual Conference & Exhibit
 AMLE On-site Professional Learning
 AMLE School Improvement Assessment

Teaching in the United States
Education-related professional associations
Educational organizations based in the United States
Professional associations based in the United States